Chaozhou is a railway station on the Taiwan Railways Administration (TRA) Pingtung line located in Chaozhou Township, Pingtung County, Taiwan.

History
The station was opened on 22 February 1920.

Around the station
 Bada Forest Paradise
 Museum of Traditional Theater

See also
 List of railway stations in Taiwan

References

1920 establishments in Taiwan
Railway stations in Pingtung County
Railway stations opened in 1920
Railway stations served by Taiwan Railways Administration